Linus Carl Henrik Wahlgren (born 10 September 1976) is a Swedish actor. He is the son of actors Christina Schollin and Hans Wahlgren and brother to actors and singers Pernilla and Niclas Wahlgren. He has also appeared in a few episodes of his sister Pernilla Wahlgren's TV series Wahlgrens värld, which is broadcast on Kanal 5.

Filmography
1983 – G – som i gemenskap
1994 – Bert
1997 – Rederiet
2000 – 102 Dalmatians (voice in Swedish dub)
2001 – Jimmy Neutron: Boy Genius (voice in Swedish dub)
2001 – Atlantis: The Lost Empire (voice in Swedish dub)
2002 – The Dog Trick
2004 – Mongolpiparen
2005 – Robots (voice in Swedish dub)
2005 – Den utvalde
2006 – Göta Kanal 2 – Kanalkampen
2008 – Irene Huss – Guldkalven
2009 – Scener ur ett kändisskap
2010 – Solsidan
2013 - Crimes of Passion
2014 – Blå Ögon (Blue Eyes) - Max Åhman in seven of the political thriller's 10 episodes
2016 - 30 Degrees in February (television)

References

External links

Swedish male film actors
Swedish male musical theatre actors
Swedish male voice actors
1976 births
Living people